Counter-Strike: Condition Zero is a first-person shooter video game developed by Ritual Entertainment, Turtle Rock Studios, and Valve, and published by Sierra Entertainment and Valve. The follow-up to Counter-Strike (2000), it was released in March 2004 for Windows. Condition Zero utilizes the GoldSrc engine and has a multiplayer mode, which features updated character models, textures, maps and other graphical tweaks. It also includes two single-player campaigns; Tour of Duty and Condition Zero: Deleted Scenes.

Alongside various other Valve titles, the game received versions for OS X and Linux in 2013.

Gameplay

Development
Condition Zero started development in 2000 by Rogue Entertainment, and was initially announced in May 2001 at E3 of that year. Rogue's producer for the game, Jim Molinets, later that year moved to Sony and the development company went defunct, leaving Valve empty. Later, they gave it to Gearbox Software, the developers of the Half-Life expansion packs, so that Valve could focus on the development rival Team Fortress 2 and its new engine.

Gearbox created an overhaul of Counter-Strike with high quality models and improved graphics. They also added alpha blending, allowing for realistic foliage and weather effects, a single-player mode to the game, similar to the final game, based on inspiration of Randy Pitchford from console games such as Tony Hawk's Pro Skater and Gran Turismo 3: A-Spec, and they included explosive weapons such as a Molotov cocktails, tear gas bomb, M60 machine-gun and M72 LAW rocket. They also used the release of Steam to their advantage to help prevent cheating by ensuring constant code updates.

After a few developmental delays, it missed its late 2002 deadline and was given over to Ritual Entertainment, who completely remade the game into a single-player one with 20 unconnected missions. It was expected to be released in early 2003 with a secondary multiplayer mode by the upstart Turtle Rock Studios, and released alongside the Xbox version of Counter-Strike.

However, after declaring the game gold and handing out review copies of Ritual's work, Valve saw an average review score of around 60%. The companies retracted the gold status and work on Condition Zero was essentially begun again. Ritual's share of development was dropped, and Valve assigned Turtle Rock to finish development. They implemented a new bot AI that was beta tested in Counter-Strike 1.6 before release. The final game contained a version mirroring Gearbox's version, along with 12 missions recovered from Ritual's single-player portion, called Deleted Scenes.

Reception

Condition Zero received "mixed or average reviews". It has a score of 65 out of 100 on Metacritic, based on reviews from 33 critics. The game was praised for its AI and new maps, while it was criticized for being out-of-date following its lengthy development.

Competitive play

Condition Zero has been featured in tournament play, although neither Condition Zero nor Counter-Strike: Source was able to generate mass interest from players of the original Counter-Strike as their successor Counter-Strike: Global Offensive did.

References

External links
 Counter-Strike: Condition Zero at MobyGames

2004 video games
Asymmetrical multiplayer video games
Counter-Strike
First-person shooters
GoldSrc games
Linux games
MacOS games
Multiplayer online games
Ritual Entertainment games
Sierra Entertainment games
Tactical shooter video games
Valve Corporation games
Video games about police officers
Video games about the Special Air Service
Video games about the United States Navy SEALs
Video games developed in the United States
Windows games